Nynke Laverman (born in Weidum on 14 April 1980) is a Dutch poet, songwriter, spoken-word artist, explorer, theatre maker and singer.

She is married to composer and sound artist Sytze Pruiksma.

Albums 
(with highest position and number of weeks in Dutch Album Top 100)
Sielesâlt (2004; No. 41, 48 weeks)
De Maisfrou (2006; No. 16, 25 weeks)
Nomade (2009; No. 31, 10 weeks)
Alter (2013; No. 71, 2 weeks)
Wachter (2016)
Plant (2021)

References

External links
Website of Nynke Laverman
Nynke Laverman on YouTube

1980 births
Living people
21st-century Dutch singers
21st-century Dutch women singers
Dutch women singer-songwriters
Dutch singer-songwriters
Musicians from Friesland
People from Leeuwarden